"Gold on the Ceiling" is the third track from El Camino, the seventh studio album by American rock band the Black Keys. It was released as the record's second single on February 25, 2012. The song was certified platinum in Australia and Canada.

Music videos
Two videos were shot for the song. The first, directed by Reid Long, features footage from the band's concerts, as well as candid shots of them on tour.

A second music video, directed by Harmony Korine, was shot prior to the single release, but was not released until May 2012. The video features the band members wearing Baby Björns and being carried by giant doppelgängers of theirs, played by two Belmont Bruins men's basketball players.

Reception
Will Hermes of Rolling Stone called the song's keyboards "a serrated organ growl backed up with a SWAT team of hand claps" and cited it as an example of Danger Mouse's prowess as a producer and co-writer. Summarizing the song, Hermes wrote, "It's Sixties bubblegum garage pop writ large, with T. Rex swagger and a guitar freakout that perfectly mirrors the lyrics, a paranoid rant that makes you shiver while you shimmy." 
John Soeder of The Plain Dealer labeled it one of the album's finest and said that it sounded like a hybrid of Norman Greenbaum's "Spirit in the Sky" and Gary Glitter's "Rock and Roll Part 2".

Harley Brown of Consequence of Sound called the song "bombastic, slightly sleazy" and said that it "best sums up The Black Keys' almost unbelievably consistent musicianship and success". Melissa Maerz of Entertainment Weekly said that the song, "with its swarm-of-bees organs and acid-trip gospel harmonies, could be a lost Nuggets gem". Randall Roberts of the Los Angeles Times, writing about the song's retro stylings, said that it "sounds as if it's existed forever". Sam Richards of NME said that the song's "brilliantly demented cowboy glam holler... is boosted by the band's new trio of female backing singers wailing for all they're worth".

Use in popular media

"Gold on the Ceiling" was used in an advertising campaign for the 2012 NCAA Men's Division I Basketball Tournament nicknamed "Brackets Everywhere" on Turner Sports and CBS Sports networks. 
A mix of the song was used in a 2012 United Kingdom advert for the Indian beer Cobra. 
It is used in the advertisements for the TV series Veep. 
It is featured in TV shows, films and video games including NCIS, Suits, MLB 12: The Show, Battleship, Workaholics, Chuck, Point Break (2015), Ocean's 8, Guitar Hero Live and the theatrical trailer for The Campaign in addition to appearing as downloadable content for Rocksmith and Rock Band 4.
It is also used in the theatrical trailer for The Campaign.
The song was performed live at the 2012 MTV Movie Awards by the band, accompanied on guitar by Johnny Depp. 
NBC Sports has made video montages with "Gold on the Ceiling" during the 2012 Summer Olympics honoring the Olympic athletes who had won gold medals.
From 2012 to 2013 before the rebrand to Fox Sports 1, the song is the theme song for NASCAR: Race Day on SPEED.
The song appears as the goal song for the Vancouver Canucks and the Nashville Predators, whose colors scheme includes gold, experimented with "Gold on the Ceiling" as its new goal song during the summer of 2014.
In one of the episodes of NBC's Superstore, this song can be heard in one scene playing in the background over the store's PA system.
From 2019-2022, the song was used as the goal song for the UMass Minutemen ice hockey team.

Single cover
The cover art for the single is a photo of the dilapidated south entrance to the former Kaufmann's/Macy's in Rolling Acres Mall in Akron, Ohio.

Personnel
Dan Auerbach – vocals, guitar
Patrick Carney –  drums
Brian Burton – keyboards, bass guitar
Ashley Wilcoxson and Leisa Hans – backing vocals

Charts

Weekly charts

Year-end charts

Certifications

References

2012 singles
The Black Keys songs
Glam rock songs
Songs written by Dan Auerbach
Songs written by Patrick Carney
Songs written by Danger Mouse (musician)
2011 songs